German submarine U-967 was a Type VIIC/41 U-boat of Nazi Germany's Kriegsmarine. Her keel was laid down on 16 May 1942 by Blohm & Voss of Hamburg, Germany. She was commissioned  on 11 March 1943 with Oberleutnant zur See Herbert Loeder in command. U-967 commanded by Korvettenkapitän Albrecht Brandi on 5 May 1944 torpedoed  in the Western Mediterranean that was sailing with convoy GUS-38.

Design
German Type VIIC submarines were preceded by the shorter Type VIIB submarines. U-967 had a displacement of  when at the surface and  while submerged. She had two shafts and two  propellers.

U-967 was fitted with five  torpedo tubes (four fitted at the bow and one at the stern), fourteen torpedoes, one  SK C/35 naval gun, 220 rounds, and one twin  C/30 anti-aircraft gun. The boat had a complement of between forty-four and sixty.

Summary of raiding history

See also
 List of submarine museums

References

Notes

Citations

Bibliography

External links

Ships built in Hamburg
German Type VIIC submarines
U-boats commissioned in 1943
World War II submarines of Germany
1943 ships
U-boats scuttled in 1944
World War II shipwrecks in the Mediterranean Sea
Maritime incidents in August 1944